Boris Viktorovich Alexandrov (November 13, 1955 — July 31, 2002) was a Soviet and Kazakh professional ice hockey player. Boris Alexandrov competed for Torpedo Ust-Kamenogorsk in 1972-1973 and in 1982-1996, and for CSKA Moscow from 1973 to 1978. He became USSR Champion in 1975, 1977 and 1978.

Career
Boris Alexandrov played only one full season in 1976 with the Team USSR, playing in 19 games, scoring four goals and winning an Olympic gold medal and a bronze in the Canada Cup in that season. But he had a very long career at the club level, which lasted well into the 1990s. Alexandrov began to play hockey with Torpedo Ust-Kamenogorsk in 1972, but in 1973 joined CSKA Moscow and played there until 1978. With CSKA Moscow Alexandrov won three Soviet Championships titles (1975, 1977, 1978) and three European Champions Cup titles (1974, 1976, 1978). After leaving CSKA Moskva Alexandrov played one season with SKA MVO Moscow, before joining Spartak Moscow from 1980-82. In 1980 while playing with Spartak Moscow Alexandrov was selected as part of the best line at the Soviet Championships. From 1982-88 Alexandrov again played with Torpedo Ust-Kamenogorsk, before spending three seasons abroad, playing with Devils Milano (Italy), Ferencvárosi TC (Hungary) and Alisa Moscow (Russia). Alexandrov ended his playing career with Torpedo Ust-Kamenogorsk from 1992-96. In 1995 he also played four games for the Kazakhstan national team and scored two goals. From 1996 until his untimely death in 2002, Alexandrov worked as a head coach of both Torpedo Ust-Kamenogorsk and the Team Kazakhstan. On 31 July 2002 Alexandrov died in a head-on collision with another car en route from Chelyabinsk to Moscow.

Career statistics

Regular season

International

Honors
Won the Olympic Games in 1976 with Team USSR.
Scored 157 goals (in 322 games) in USSR Championship.
He competed at the Super Series '76 with the team CSKA Moscow and scored against New York Rangers, Montreal Canadiens and Boston Bruins.
WJC Top Scorer in 1974.
All Star Team in 1975 Junior WC.
Won USSR Championship in 1975, 1977 and 1978.

Personal life
His son Viktor Alexandrov is also an ice hockey player. He was drafted 83rd overall by the St. Louis Blues in the 2004 NHL Entry Draft, but he never signed a contract.

References

External links

1955 births
2002 deaths
Armed Forces sports society athletes
HC CSKA Moscow players
Ice hockey players at the 1976 Winter Olympics
Kazakhstan men's national ice hockey team coaches
Kazakhstani ice hockey coaches
Kazakhstani ice hockey right wingers
Kazzinc-Torpedo head coaches
Kazzinc-Torpedo players
HC Milano players
HC MVD players
IIHF Hall of Fame inductees
Olympic gold medalists for the Soviet Union
Olympic ice hockey players of the Soviet Union
Olympic medalists in ice hockey
Sportspeople from Oskemen
Road incident deaths in Russia
Soviet expatriate sportspeople in Italy
Soviet expatriate ice hockey players
Soviet expatriate sportspeople in Hungary
Soviet ice hockey right wingers
HC Spartak Moscow players
Medalists at the 1976 Winter Olympics